Alaudin is a 2003 Indian Tamil language action drama film directed by Ravi Chakravathy. The film stars Prabhu Deva and Ashima Bhalla with Raghuvaran playing the main antagonist. The film was released on 15 August 2003 after many delays.

Plot
Alaudin (Prabhu Deva) is a slum man and orphan with a golden heart who fights against injustice faced by his fellow slum dwellers. The people of Alli Kuppam bring him up. To fulfil the day-to-day needs of the poor, Alaudin decides to steal from rich people. His main enemy is the scheming and powerful Gangadhar (Raghuvaran). During one of his attempts to steal in Gangadhar's house, Alaudin witnesses a murder committed by Gangadhar and gets some implicating evidence: a blood-soaked knife and a cut right thumb of Gangadhar. He cleverly uses this situation and starts blackmailing Gangadhar to accomplish all of Alli Kuppam's needs. Gangadhar becomes his golden goose, his magic lamp, which does his every proposition. Preethi (Ashima Bhalla) is Gangadhar's manager's daughter, and she falls for Alaudin. All efforts to catch Alaudin fail. In the final move, Gangadhar plans carefully, traps Alaudin, and shoots him at point-blank range. A chance look at the chain worn by Alaudin brings the necessary twist to the story. To his shock, Gangadhar realizes Alaudin is his son who was mistaken to be murdered 25 years ago. The saved Alaudin refuses to accept his father's request to stay back with him and takes a promise that he should not reveal the secret to anyone and that he wants to go back to the Kuppam.

Cast

 Prabhu Deva as Alaudin
 Ashima Bhalla as Preethi
 Raghuvaran as Gangadhar
 Manivannan as Chinnasamy, Preethi's father
 Vinu Chakravarthy as Munusamy
 Charle as Chinnasamy's assistant
 Dhamu as Alaudin's friend
 Vaiyapuri as Alaudin's friend
 Poovilangu Mohan as Sundaram
 Mahanadi Shankar as the Police inspector
 Sukran as Alaudin's friend
 Sabitha Anand as Mallika
 Kalairani as Rasathi
 Shanmugasundari as Slum dweller
 Vandana as Selvi
 Bava Lakshmanan as Astrologer
 Chitti Babu as Auctioneer
 Vincent Roy as Central Minister
 Kovai Senthil as Slum dweller
 LIC Narasimhan as Groom's father
 Singamuthu as Raja Bhai
 Tirupur Ramasamy as Slum dweller
 Jayamani as Thangarasu
 Karnaa Radha as Meesai
 Sahadevan as Genie
 Pon Swathi as Slum dweller
 Pawan as Gangadhar's henchman (uncredited role)
 Aruldoss in an uncredited role

Soundtrack

The film score and the soundtrack were composed by Mani Sharma. The soundtrack features 5 tracks.

Reception
Sify wrote, "He [Prabhu Deva] has matured as an actor [..] Raghuvaran is terrific as usual in the role of the villain. Ramnath Shetty's camera, Mani Sharma's music and the song picturizations are worth mentioning. On the whole, the film is enjoyable and engaging at times". Another reviewer said, "With a well-thought-out, interesting screenplay and a fast pace, Alaaudin turns out to be one of the better entries in recent times."

References

External links
 

2003 films
2000s Tamil-language films
Indian action drama films
2003 directorial debut films
Robin Hood films
Films scored by Mani Sharma
2003 action drama films